This bibliography of Abdul Majid Daryabadi is a selected list of generally available scholarly resources related to Abdul Majid Daryabadi, an Islamic scholar, philosopher, writer, critic, researcher, journalist and exegete of the Quran in Indian subcontinent in 20th century. He wrote an autobiography in Urdu titled Aap Biti, published in 1978. In this work, he tried to cover all the information related to himself as well as the remarkable events of his life. This list will include his biographies, theses written on him and articles published about him in various journals, newspapers, encyclopedias, seminars, websites etc. in APA style.

Encyclopedias

Biographies

Theses

Journals

Seminars

Other

Books

Journals

References 

Abdul Majid Daryabadi
Islam-related lists
Deobandi-related bibliographies
Bibliographies of people
Indian biographies
Lists of books